Montana (Jackson W. Brice) is a character appearing in American comic books published by Marvel Comics. He is depicted as the leader of the Enforcers, a team of assassins usually employed by other villains such as the Big Man, the Green Goblin, and the Kingpin, which often places them in conflict with the superheroes Spider-Man and Daredevil.

Montana has been adapted from the comics into numerous forms of media, most notably adopting the Shocker persona in both The Spectacular Spider-Man animated series (voiced by Jeff Bennett) and the 2017 Marvel Cinematic Universe film Spider-Man: Homecoming (portrayed by Logan Marshall-Green).

Publication history
Montana first appeared alongside the other Enforcers in The Amazing Spider-Man #10 (March 1964), and was created by Stan Lee and Steve Ditko.

The character subsequently appears in The Amazing Spider-Man #14 (July 1964), #19 (December 1964), The Amazing Spider-Man Annual #1 (1964), Marvel Team-Up #39-40 (November–December 1975), The Spectacular Spider-Man #19-20 (June–July 1978), Dazzler #7-8 (October–September 1981), Marvel Team-Up #138 (February 1984), Tales of the Marvels: Inner Demons #1 (1996), Civil War: War Crimes #1 (February 2007), Daredevil #99-100 (September–October 2007), #102 (January 2008), and The Amazing Spider-Man #562-563 (August 2008).

Montana appeared as part of the "Enforcers" entry in the Official Handbook of the Marvel Universe Deluxe Edition #4.

Fictional character biography
Jackson Brice was born in Bozeman, Montana. Along with Fancy Dan (Daniel Brito) and Ox (Raymond Bloch), he was a founding member of the Enforcers. He has great proficiency with the lariat.

Montana, Fancy Dan and Ox make their first appearance under the employ of the Big Man (Frederick Foswell). During this time, they have their first run-in with their longtime nemesis Spider-Man. During their first fight against the web-slinger, Montana's lasso skills initially prove successful but Spider-Man defeats the trio.

Over the next couple of years, Montana and the team would be employed by Lightmaster in one of his many schemes, again bringing them into conflict with Spider-Man, with similar results. They would then lend their services to Tech-Master in his revenge plot against Harry S. Osgood, only to be defeated by Dazzler. Montana and the team would also go up against She-Hulk at one point.

Following the 2006 "Civil War" storyline, Montana, Ox (Ronald Bloch) and Fancy Dan reunite to work for Mister Fear, which pits them directly against Daredevil. After Mister Fear's arrest, the Enforcers are taken in by the Hood's organization.

Following the events of the 2008 "Spider-Man: Brand New Day" storyline, the Enforcers are patrons at the Bar With No Name. They take bets with a person calling himself "The Bookie", over whether Spider-Man will show up to battle "Basher", an unknown villain who claimed to have fought Spider-Man. Spider-Man shows up, but is revealed to be Screwball in disguise when the real web-head shows up. The Enforcers decide to get revenge on The Bookie, capturing him. The Bookie's father calls Spider-Man for assistance, and he agrees to help. Spider-Man defeats Fancy Dan and Montana.

In the story arc "Kill To Be You", Montana is the right-hand man of the Kingpin (Wilson Fisk), and shows contempt toward the Hobgoblin (Phil Urich). When Spider-Man and the Black Cat come to steal back the Reverbium, Montana falls out a window to his death while Hobgoblin saves Kingpin. Hobgoblin cruelly joked that "he'll be missed by everyone – except the pavement".

During the 2016-2017 "Dead No More: The Clone Conspiracy" storyline, Montana is among the cloned villains by Miles Warren's company New U Technologies. He is involved in a fight with the other cloned supervillains until it is broken up by the clone of the Prowler.

Other versions
 In the future timeline of the 1999 Earth X miniseries, Montana had been mutated and developed the ability to change his hands into lassos. He and his fellow Enforcers were hired as heavies to protect President Norman Osborn. However, this protection proved to be ineffectual when the Skull came to New York to take over America. He took control of Montana and the Enforcers and murdered Osborn. Montana's fate following the defeat of the Skull remains unknown.
 In Spider-Man Noir, Montana and the other Enforcers serve as muscle for a crime boss called the "Goblin".
 The Ultimate Marvel incarnation of Montana is Montana Bale, an employee of the Kingpin of Crime in New York along with Fancy Dan (Dan Crenshaw) and Ox (Bruno Sanchez).

In other media

Television
 Montana, referred to as the "Cowboy", appears in the 1960s Spider-Man series episode "Blueprint for Crime", voiced by Bernard Cowan.

 Montana appears as the Shocker in The Spectacular Spider-Man, voiced by Jeff Bennett. He is the leader of the Enforcers and the owner of the Big Sky Billiard Room, a bar frequented by New York City's criminals. The character was chosen to act as the show's incarnation of Shocker because producer Greg Weisman felt he was more interesting and threatening than Herman Schultz, Shocker's alter ego in the comics. Montana's Shocker costume is similar to the source material with added goggles and larger vibration gauntlets. Introduced in the pilot episode "Survival of the Fittest", Montana and the Enforcers are hired by Hammerhead to kill Spider-Man for the crime lord Tombstone. In "Market Forces", Montana dons a battlesuit stolen from Tricorp with shockwave-generating gauntlets and becomes the "Shocker" to complete his contract with Tombstone. Despite besting the web-slinger during their first encounter, Shocker is captured when Spider-Man traps him in a collapsing theater. In "Group Therapy", Shocker breaks out of prison and joins the Sinister Six. The group of supervillains initially overwhelms Spider-Man, but his black suit later takes control of his body to defeat them. By the time of season two, Shocker has left the Sinister Six to rejoin the Enforcers. In "Probable Cause", Shocker and the "New Enforcers" are hired by Tombstone to rob the Federal Gold Repository, but Spider-Man intervenes and Hammerhead sabotages their escape as part of his plan to usurp Tombstone, resulting in their apprehension. In "Opening Night", Montana and the other inmates in the Vault are released by the Green Goblin to hunt down Spider-Man, who has been trapped in the prison. The villains are all recaptured when Walter Hardy fills the complex with sleeping gas.
 Montana appears in the Ultimate Spider-Man episode "Nightmare on Christmas", voiced by Troy Baker.

Film
Jackson Brice appears as the Shocker in the live-action Marvel Cinematic Universe film Spider-Man: Homecoming (2017), portrayed by Logan Marshall-Green. This version is a member of Adrian Toomes' criminal enterprise and wields a modified version of Crossbones' vibration-emitting gauntlet. He is fired by Toomes after a weapons deal with Aaron Davis attracts Spider-Man's attention; when Brice threatens to expose the operation to Toomes' family and threatens them, Toomes attempts to intimidate him with one of Phineas Mason's weapons, but inadvertently disintegrates him instead. Brice's gauntlet and mantle are subsequently passed down to Herman Schultz.

Merchandise
In 2009, Hasbro released an action figure of Shocker in their "Spider Charged" wave of toys based on The Spectacular Spider-Man.

References

External links
 Montana at Comicvine

Characters created by Stan Lee
Characters created by Steve Ditko
Comics characters introduced in 1964
Fictional assassins in comics
Fictional characters from Montana
Fictional marksmen and snipers
Fictional mercenaries in comics
Fictional murderers
Marvel Comics male supervillains
Marvel Comics supervillains
Marvel Comics Western (genre) characters
Spider-Man characters
Superhero film characters
Western (genre) gunfighters
Western (genre) outlaws